Haddad (Aramaic: ܚܕܕ or ܚܕܐܕ, ;) is a primarily Levantine family name originating in Aramaic. 

The original Haddad (Aramaic: ܚܕܕ or ܚܕܐܕ) surname means blacksmith in Semitic languages. It is commonly used in the Levant and in Algeria. In the  Aramaic-Turoyo dialect, the Haddads are also known as "Hadodo ܚܕܕܐ". People with the surname Hadodo, are usually Assyrian Syriac Christians from Tur Abdin. Although ancestry of the last name varies due to migration, there exists a variety of origins, and not all of the name carriers share the same blood line. Hadad is also the name of a Semitic storm-god.

Note that some of the Israeli surnames mentioned below were adopted by European Jewish immigrants during the period known as Hebraization of surnames starting in the 1920s.

Persons with surname

Haddad
Aaron Haddad (born 1982), American professional wrestler best known as Damien Sandow
Abd al-Masih Haddad (1890–1963), writer of the Mahjar movement and journalist
Amir Haddad (born 1984), Israeli French singer
Amir-John Haddad (born 1975), German-Spanish flamenco guitarist and multi-instrumentalist
Antoine Haddad (born 1954), Lebanese politician 
Andreas Haddad (born 1982), Assyrian Swedish footballer
Beatriz Haddad Maia (born 1996), Brazilian tennis player
Brendha Haddad (born 1986), Brazilian actress
Caroline Haddad, Canadian competitive pair skater
Dany Haddad (born 1960), Lebanese fencer
Diana Haddad (born 1976), Lebanese singer
Drew Haddad (born 1978), American football player
Eddie Haddad (1928–1978), Canadian boxer
Fairuz (born 1935), birth name Nouhad Wadie' Haddad, Lebanese singer
Fawwaz Haddad (born 1947), Syrian novelist
Fernando Haddad (born 1963), Brazilian academic and politician
Fouad Haddad (1927–1985), Egyptian poet
George Ibrahim Haddad, Jordanian writer, poet, and journalist
Ghassan Haddad (1926-2021), Syrian politician, served as a General in the army and as the minister of planning
Hubert Haddad (born 1947), Tunisian poet, playwright, and writer
Humberto Hernandez-Haddad (born 1951), Mexican lawyer, Senator, and Federal Congressman 
Ibrahim Haddad (born 1938), Syrian politician and minister
Ilias Haddad (born 1989), Dutch-Moroccan footballer
Jamey Haddad (born 1952), American jazz percussionist
Jerrier A. Haddad (1922–2017), computer engineer
Joumana Haddad (born 1970), Lebanese poet, translator, journalist, and women's rights activist
Karim Haddad (born 1962), Lebanese composer
Kasia Haddad (born 1979), British actress
Lahcen Haddad (born 1960), Moroccan politician
Lawrence Haddad (born 1959), British economist
Line Haddad (born 1978), French-Israeli pair skater
Maria Ziadie-Haddad (born 1955), Jamaican airline pilot
Malek Haddad (1927–1978), Algerian poet and writer
Maya Haddad   (2009-) famous artis/dancer
Meryam Haddad (born 1988), Canadian politician
Michel Haddad (born 1902), Egyptian boxer
Mohammed Haddad (born 1975), Bahraini composer and music critic 
Musue Noha Haddad, Liberian journalist and photojournalist
Nabil Haddad, Jordanian Arab priest of the Melkite Greek Catholic Church
Óscar Bitar Haddad (born 1942), Mexican politician
Paul Haddad (1963-2020), English-born Canadian actor
Qassim Haddad (born 1948), Bahraini poet
Radley Haddad (born 1990), American baseball coach
Rudy Haddad (born 1985), French-Israeli football player
Saad Haddad (1936–1984), Lebanese militant
Sami Haddad (born 1950), Lebanese businessman, politician, and government minister
Sami Ibrahim Haddad (1890–1957), Lebanese physician and writer
Shai Haddad (born 1987), Israeli footballer
Sonya Haddad (1936–2004), American translator and surtitler
Soraya Haddad (born 1984), Algerian judoka
Tahar Haddad (1899–1935), Tunisian author, scholar, and reformer
Vico Haddad (born 1960), Israeli footballer and sports manager
Wadie Haddad (1927–1978), Palestinian former head of the armed wing of the PFLP
Wassim Michael Haddad (born 1961), Lebanese-Greek-American mathematician, scientist, and engineer
William J. Haddad (1915–2010), Canadian lawyer and jurist
Yvonne Haddad, Syrian professor

Hadad
Amir Hadad (born 1978), Israeli tennis player 
Astrid Hadad (born 1957), Lebanese-Mexican actress
Aviv Hadad (born 1984), Israeli footballer
Daniel Hadad (born 1961), Argentine telecommunication businessman
Haneh Hadad (1919–2020), Israeli Arab politician and Member of the Knesset
Mauricio Hadad (born 1971), Colombian tennis player
Sarit Hadad (born 1978), Israeli singer

Al Haddad
Abdallah ibn Alawi al-Haddad (1634–1720), Yemeni Islamic scholar
Abdulrahman Al-Haddad (born 1966), Emirati footballer
Muayad Al-Haddad (born 1960), Kuwaiti footballer
Saleh Al-Haddad (born 1986), Kuwaiti track and field athlete

El Haddad
Andre El Haddad (born 1971), Lebanese football referee
Laila el-Haddad, Palestinian freelance journalist, author, and media activist
Mahmoud El-Haddad (born 1986), Egyptian weightlifter
Saad El-Haddad, birth name of Baba Saad or just Saad, German rapper of Lebanese descent
Essam El-Haddad (born 1953), Egyptian politician

Other
Estádio Anísio Haddad, usually known as Rio Pretão, multi-purpose stadium in São José do Rio Preto, Brazil

See also
Hadad (disambiguation)
Hadid (name)

References

Arabic-language surnames
Jewish surnames
Mizrahic surnames
Surnames